Rocklands is a historic home and farm complex located near Gordonsville, Orange County, Virginia. The house was built about 1905, and underwent a major renovation under the direction of William Lawrence Bottomley in 1933–1935. It is a -story, five-bay, Georgian Revival style brick dwelling with a hipped roof.  The front facade features a monumental Ionic order hexastyle portico. Also on the property are the contributing guest house (c. 1905, 1935); a small service court designed by Bottomley and consisting of a garage, servant's house, woodshed, and tunnel; a 19th-century coach
barn of wood-frame construction; the mid-19th century farm manager's house; Spencer Neale, Jr., Residence (c. 1900); bank barn (c. 1910); and a brick house (1822).

It was listed on the National Register of Historic Places in 2005.

References

Houses on the National Register of Historic Places in Virginia
Georgian Revival architecture in Virginia
Houses completed in 1935
Houses in Orange County, Virginia
National Register of Historic Places in Orange County, Virginia